Groupe BPCE (for Banque Populaire Caisse d'Epargne) is a major French banking group formed by the 2009 merger of two major retail banking groups, Groupe Caisse d'Épargne and Groupe Banque Populaire. As of 2021, it was France's fourth largest bank, the seventh largest in Europe, and the nineteenth in the world by total assets. It has more than 8,200 branches nationwide under their respective brand names serving nearly 150 million customers. It is Europe's largest bank by revenue, ahead of BNP Paribas and HSBC. It is considered a global systemically important bank (G-SIB) by the Financial Stability Board.

Background

Caisses d'Épargne, Eulia and Ixis

Groupe Caisse d'Épargne ("Savings Bank Group") was born in 1818 with the foundation of the Paris savings bank, . In 1999, new legislation transformed the savings banks into cooperatives. These developments paved the way for the gradual transformation of the decentralized network of savings banks into an increasingly integrated universal banking group in the next decade.

In July 1999, CNCE acquired majority ownership of Crédit Foncier de France. Also in 1999, France's Caisse des dépôts et consignations (CDC) formed a commercial and investment banking subsidiary, CDC IXIS. In 2001, CNCE and CDC formed a joint venture, Eulia, to which CDC contributed CDC IXIS. In June 2004, CNCE took full control of Eulia and therefore also of CDC IXIS, which it renamed Ixis. Between 2003 and 2008 CNCE separately acquired the French subsidiary of Sanpaolo IMI, including the former  and French operations of the Banque Française Commerciale, and made it its private banking subsidiary under the new brand Banque Palatine adopted in June 2005.

Banques Populaires and Natexis

Groupe Banque Populaire ("People's Bank Group") was born in 1878 with the foundation of the first local Popular Bank in the western French city of Angers.

In 1919, the French state sponsored the creation of Crédit National, a specialized bank. In 1946, the French state created Compagnie Française d'Assurance pour le Commerce Extérieur (Coface), a trade credit insurer, and Banque Française du Commerce Extérieur (BFCE), a specialized bank providing export financing services. In 1996, Crédit National purchased BFCE, and the merged entity renamed itself as Natexis, in which natex is a portmanteau of national and extérieur.

The CCBP purchased Natexis in 1998, and renamed it Natexis Banques Populaires. Natexis Banques Populaires purchased Coface in 2002. That same year, cooperative bank the  joined the Banque Populaire network.

Natixis

In 2006 the two groups, Caisse d'Épargne and Banque Populaire, agreed to merge their commercial and investment banking subsidiaries, respectively Ixis and Natexis Banques Populaires. The new entity was given the name Natixis, a portmanteau of Natexis and Ixis.

Natixis, however, soon suffered from poor capital allocation and risk management choices in the context of the Financial crisis of 2007–2008, including on investments into Bernie Madoff's funds.

Creation of BPCE and subsequent developments

In 2008 and early 2009, the French state provided around 7 billion euros of financial support to the group formed by Caisse d'Épargne, Banque Populaire and Natixis. François Pérol, a senior aide to President Nicolas Sarkozy, led the decision-making on the group's restructuring. That same day, Pérol became its CEO while , previously the chairman of Groupe Banque Populaire, became non-executive chairman of BPCE.

In 2014, BPCE had Coface listed through an initial public offering, and subsequently reduced its equity stake. As of March 2021, BPCE retained residual ownership of 12.7 percent of Coface's capital.

In July 2016, BPCE announced the purchase of Fidor Bank, a Fintech challenger bank, operating in the UK and Germany, but in November 2018 considered selling it again.

In 2018–2019, BPCE fully integrated the former Crédit Foncier de France's activities into its other operations and terminated the use of the Crédit Foncier brand.

Leadership

Groupe BPCE has had two chief executives so far: 
 François Pérol (July 2009 - May 2018)
  (June 2018 – present)

Structure and operations

Despite the 2009 merger, the two networks of local banks, Caisse d'Épargne and Banque Populaire, continue to operate under separate and to an extent competing brands. BPCE is fully owned by the local savings banks and popular banks, which in turn are legally owned by their customers as cooperative members.

BPCE provides various deposit and loan products to small and medium enterprises, craftspeople, franchisees, and franchisers; savings collection and management, credit, payment, and wealth management services; and real estate financing and corporate banking services. The company also offers bancassurance products, including life assurance and pensions that comprise automobile and home insurance, legal protection, the guarantee of life accidents, the supplementary health care insurance, welfare professionals and the collective retirement pensions and health, as well as credit insurance and guarantees to individuals, professionals, real estate professionals, and businesses.

Controversies

In 2010 the French government's competition authority, the Autorité de la concurrence, fined eleven banks, including Groupe BPCE, 385 million euros in the context of the French check processing fee controversy of 2010.

In 2022, Groupe BPCE's subsidiary Natixis, which owns a property at the famous intersection of Haight and Ashbury Streets in San Francisco, is forcing legendary music venue Club DeLuxe, the nesting ground for Swing revival, to close its doors.

See also

 BNP Paribas
 Société Générale
 Crédit Agricole
 Crédit Mutuel

References 
 

Systemically important financial institutions
Banks under direct supervision of the European Central Bank
BPCE